SCi Entertainment Group plc (formerly The Sales Curve Limited and SCi (Sales Curve Interactive) Limited) was a British video game publisher based in London. The company was founded in 1988 by Jane Cavanagh and floated on the stock exchange in 1996. In May 2005, SCi acquired Eidos plc, the parent company of publisher Eidos Interactive, and merged their operations by June 2006. In December 2008, SCi was briefly renamed Eidos and was subsequently acquired by Square Enix in March 2009.

History
Jane Cavanagh, formerly an executive for British Telecom's Telecomsoft division, founded The Sales Curve in 1988, following a trip to Japan that convinced her of the potential of the video game industry. Cavanagh established and ran the company without external funding, and owned 100% of the company's shares. The Sales Curve was renamed SCi (Sales Curve Interactive) in 1994, and floated on the stock market in 1996, becoming SCi Entertainment.

In February 2004, the company acquired Pivotal Games. In October 2004, SCi announced publishing agreements of its games for the Gizmondo handheld. In January 2005, SCi invested in Rocksteady Studios, acquiring 25.1% of the company's shares.

Eidos acquisition 
In April 2005, SCi entered into a  bid for Eidos plc, the parent company of Eidos Interactive. Eidos was acquired by SCi in May 2005, and fully merged with SCi by June 2006. Following Eidos' acquisition, all executives of the acquired company resigned, and were replaced by SCi's management. In October 2005, SCi employed around 600 people. By February 2006, it was the largest video game company in Great Britain. In December 2006, Warner Bros. started investing in SCi in exchange for granting game licences to Warner Bros. films to SCi. Warner Bros. owned 10.3% in September 2007.

In July 2006, Cavanagh stepped down as chairwoman of SCi, while remaining chief executive officer (CEO). She was replaced by Tim Ryan, formerly non-executive director, as non-executive chairman of the board. In the 2007 New Year Honours, Cavanagh was named Officer of the Order of the British Empire (OBE) for her services in the video game industry, particularly SCi. Cavanagh was ousted as CEO in January 2008, and left the company alongside her husband, Bill Ennis, and studio chief Rob Murphy. Following their departure, SCi's shares doubled in value. At the time, SCi had 900 employees. On 2 December 2008, SCi filed for changing its name to Eidos, which was finalised the following day. During 2008 the company raised £60 million at 35p a share. Eidos shareholders approved the acquisition by Square Enix on 27 March 2009 at 32p a share, a valuation of just over £84 million.

References

External links
Official website archived in 2005

Square Enix
Eidos
British companies established in 1988
Video game companies established in 1988
Video game companies disestablished in 2009
Defunct video game companies of the United Kingdom